Roxbury State Forest covers  in 3 blocks in Roxbury, Vermont in Washington County. The forest is managed by the Vermont Department of Forests, Parks, and Recreation for timber management, dispersed recreation, and wildlife habitat protection.

Activities in the forest include remote camping, backcountry hiking, skiing and snowshoeing.

References

External links
Official website

Vermont state forests
Protected areas of Washington County, Vermont
Roxbury, Vermont
Civilian Conservation Corps in Vermont